Kadeem Corbin (4 March 1996) is a Trinbagonian footballer who plays as a forward for La Horquetta Rangers.

He made his international debut versus Curaçao in June 2015.

References

External links

1996 births
Living people
Association football forwards
Trinidad and Tobago footballers
People from Diego Martin
St. Ann's Rangers F.C. players
Central F.C. players
San Juan Jabloteh F.C. players
W Connection F.C. players
TT Pro League players
Trinidad and Tobago international footballers
Trinidad and Tobago under-20 international footballers
2015 CONCACAF Gold Cup players
2015 CONCACAF U-20 Championship players